The Danny Woo International District Community Garden is a community garden on the outskirts of the International District, Seattle, Washington. It was built in 1975 and provides 101 allotments and 77 fruit trees.

Allotment plots are allocated by preference to those aged over 65, residents of the International District, and those whose income is below 30% of the median. The garden is managed by the Inter*Im Community Development Association, a community development non-profit serving the Chinatown-International District. Much of the design in the garden has been through the efforts of UW architecture students. In their work, they were concerned in creating a natural and Asian environment.

At 1.5 acres – the Danny Woo International District Community Garden is the largest green space in Seattle's South Downtown. The garden serves over 70 low-income, primarily non-English speaking gardeners. The average age of the community gardeners is 76 years old.

While the gardens primarily serve low-income seniors, the Danny Woo International District Community Garden also has a Children's Garden in which 265 K-12 children go through Inter*Im's Seed-to-Plate program. The Seed-to-Plate program focuses on raising sustainable foods, promoting better nutritional choices, and teaching children the science behind food production. The gardens utilize over 300 volunteers to aid with its operations and programs and receives over 1,000 visitors annually.

In 2014, Inter*Im created a kitchen in the gardens to support their Seed-to-Plate program, as well as providing a venue for low-income community members.

Description 
Tucked away on a sunny hillside overlooking the International District, a short walk from downtown Seattle, lies one of Seattle's largest and most unique community gardens.  The Danny Woo International District Community Gardens was established in 1975 by InterIm Community Development Association and the efforts of countless volunteers. The garden's four terraces are surrounded by fruit trees and have many places for visitors to rest, gardeners to wash their vegetables, or tourists to take in the view. The view from the garden includes Elliott Bay, the Olympic mountains, the Port of Seattle, South Downtown, and Beacon Hill.

The Danny Woo Gardens includes 101 garden plots tended primarily by elderly, low-income, Asian residents. It provides them with opportunities for exercise, social connection, and to continue their agricultural heritage.  The primary languages of the gardeners are Korean and Cantonese and the vegetables grown there reflect the Asian cultures.  Most garden plots are used primarily for food production. Fruit trees including cherries, plums, Asian pears, and apples.

History 
In the early 1970s, problems existed between various small business and community agencies. The residual effects of the construction of the Kingdome and I-5 freeway left a bitter taste with many residents, while the persistent problems of crime and the removal of residential units due to the Ozark fire code and age further depressed the social and economic value of the area. In 1975, business and community leaders came together to create the Danny Woo International District Gardens to ameliorate the conditions of the International District. The garden was symbolic of what needed to be done – a project that helped create community between the various groups in the International District.

Danny Woo, a landowner and restaurateur, donated the land. A forest of six-foot-high blackberry brambles covered the property. Consequently, the conversion of the garden to its present state demanded more than ten thousand hours of volunteer labor. In the mid-1980s additional land, given by the city of Seattle, was attached to the eastern part of the garden.

In recent years, the garden has seen the construction of concrete stairs, a lighting system, a tool shed, and an accessible garden. The accessible garden is at the top of the hill (northernmost part of the garden) and is for seniors who are not able to stoop down or handicapped individuals unable to walk. Additionally, Inter*Im finished the construction of two light posts and several new pathways for the gardeners.

Demographics 
Inter*Im has had a policy of prioritizing the use of the garden. International District (ID) residents who are 55 years or older are given the highest priority, while ID residents who are younger than 55 years are second on the priority list. If there is space, seniors living outside the district are given a plot. Each individual can have up to two plots.

Most of the gardeners have historically been of Asian descent.  Currently, many of the gardeners are either Korean or Chinese, however there are gardeners who are of Philippine, Japanese, Vietnamese, and European descent. Many of these Asian gardeners cannot speak English. The garden has seen gardeners working past their 90s in the garden.

The garden is usually a haven for the gardeners, since many of them live in very tight quarters. Some gardeners live in Single Room Occupancy units - rooms that have no bathroom or kitchen—which are converted hotel rooms that used to house the immigrant Asian male community in the 20th century. Additionally, because many of the gardeners have agrarian backgrounds, gardening is a powerful recreational devise and it is also a place for many gardeners to congregate and create friendships.

References

Geography of Seattle
Urban agriculture
Community gardening in Washington (state)
Chinatown–International District, Seattle